The Winds of Kitty Hawk is a 1978 American made-for-television biographical film directed by E. W. Swackhamer about the Wright brothers and their invention of the first successful powered heavier-than-air flying machine, the Wright Flyer. It's a tribute to the brothers and was broadcast on December 17, 1978, the 75th anniversary of their famous 1903 first aeroplane flight. It is one of several made-for-television films about historical people in aviation produced in the 1970s, including The Amazing Howard Hughes, Amelia Earhart, and The Lindbergh Kidnapping Case.

The film presents the brothers' lives in dramatic vignettes sometimes historically rearranged. The film makes a claimer at the beginning stating that dramatic license had been taken but for the most part their story is told chronologically.

In 2012, the film became available on DVD from MGM Limited Edition.

Cast
Michael Moriarty as Wilbur Wright
David Huffman as Orville Wright
Tom Bower as William Tate
Robin Gammell as H.A. Toulmin
Scott Hylands as Glenn Curtiss
John Randolph as Alexander Graham Bell
Kathryn Walker as Katharine Wright
Eugene Roche as Bishop Milton Wright
John Hoyt - Professor Samuel Langley
Joseph Bernard - Mayor of New York, George B. McClellan Jr.
Lew Brown - Harlan Mumford (banker)
Carole Tru Foster - Agnes Osborne
Dabbs Greer - Ace Hutchin
Mo Malone - Elizabeth Mayfield
Robert Casper - Man
Tom Lawrence - Doctor
Ross Durfee - William Howard Taft
Charles Macaulay - 2nd Genteral
Frank Farmer - Mr. Newell
Steffen Zacharias - Fisherman
Laurence Haddon - 1st General
Ari Zeltzer - Tom Tate
Vaughn Armstrong - Reporter
Marie Todd - 
Gerald Berns - Reporter

See also
Wright Flyer
The Wright Brothers (1971 film)

References

External links
The Winds of Kitty Hawk at IMDb.com
[http://www.allmovie.com/movie/the-winds-of-kitty-hawk-v54761 allmovie/synopsis; The Winds of Kitty Hawk]
Winds of Kitty Hawk; Aveleyman
Sample of Charles Bernstein's score to the film(Period Orchestral - 1904 flight'') and others

1978 television films
1978 films
1970s biographical drama films
American aviation films
American television films
American biographical drama films
Films set in the 1890s
Films set in the 1900s
Biographical television films
Cultural depictions of the Wright brothers
Films directed by E. W. Swackhamer
1970s American films